More Truth Than Poetry is a 1917 American silent drama film, directed by Burton King. It stars Olga Petrova, Mahlon Hamilton, and Charles Martin, and was released on October 22, 1917.

Cast list
 Olga Petrova as Elaine Esmond/Vera Maitland
 Mahlon Hamilton as Ashton Blair/Blake Wendell
 Charles Martin as Daniel Maitland
 Violet Reed as Florence Grant
 Harry Burkhardt as Robert Grant
 Mary Sands as Grace Danby
 William B. Davidson as Allen Danby
 Tony Merlo as Louis Barrentos

References

External links 
 
 
 

1917 drama films
1917 films
Silent American drama films
American silent feature films
American black-and-white films
Metro Pictures films
Films directed by Burton L. King
1910s English-language films
1910s American films